Starpoint Gemini Warlords is a blend of space trading and combat simulator, role-playing and 4X video game developed by Croatian-based Little Green Men Games and published by Iceberg Interactive. Starpoint Gemini Warlords is a spin-off title to the space sim Starpoint Gemini 2, which was released in 2014.

Development
Little Green Men Games developed Starpoint Gemini 2 based on the community feedback and suggestions in the Steam Early Access program. Although most of the popular suggestions made it in the game, some of the ideas could not be implemented in Starpoint Gemini 2. The feature requests not suitable for Starpoint Gemini 2 were kept on a wishlist and became the base of the new spin-off title Starpoint Gemini Warlords. Just like its predecessor, Starpoint Gemini Warlords will go through Early Access where the developers intend to implement feature suggestions from their community and change the game according to their feedback. The game was scheduled to stay approximately 6 to 12 months in Steam Early Access and was finished and released after 11 months.

Features
Starpoint Gemini Warlords is a role-playing space sim with a 4X layer. Players can captain various space ships ranging from gunships to carriers and give orders to war fleets on the strategy map. The game takes place in the Gemini System and features pre-scripted story missions (Campaign) and a free roam mode (Conquest).

Release
Starpoint Gemini Warlords was released on May 23, 2017, on Steam and GoG in two versions - Standard and Deluxe Edition. Deluxe Edition includes 160 page full color Artbook, Original Game Soundtrack composed by Nikola Nikita Jeremić, selection of wallpapers and Twitch Overlays.

Reception
The game received mixed to positive reviews and currently holds an aggregated score of 73 on Metacritic, based on 11 reviews, and a score of 70% on Gamerankings, based on 6 reviews.

Sales
The game sold more than 200,000 copies.

References

External links

2017 video games
Windows games
Windows-only games
Space trading and combat simulators
Video games developed in Croatia
Space opera video games
Science fiction video games
Video game sequels
Iceberg Interactive games
Early access video games